Lieutenant General Yogendra Dimri, PVSM, AVSM, VSM is a former General Officer in the Indian Army. He last served as the General Officer Commanding-in-Chief of the Central Command in April 2021. He previously served as a Corps Commander and as Chief of Staff of the Western Command, he was appointed as a military attaché in the United Nations Transitional Authority in Cambodia and directing staff at the Defence Services Staff College.

Prior to his appointment to the Central Command, he commanded XXI Corps and infantry brigade on the Line of Control (LOC).

Biography 
Dimri was commissioned into the Indian military's regiment Bombay Engineer Group on 17 December 1983. He did his schooling from St. Joseph's College, Allahabad. He obtained his professional courses from the various institutions such as National Defence Academy in Khadakwasla, Indian Military Academy, Defence Services Staff College, Defence Services Command and Staff College and the Army War College, Mhow.

He was the recipient of the Silver Grenade in the Young Officers Course and the Gold Medal in the military Engineers Degree Course. He was also awarded President's Gold Medal at the Indian Military Academy for qualifying with "first" in the order of merit.

He also served at staff and instructional posts such as brigadier general at Staff Operations of a Corps and deputy director general for Military Operations at the Integrated Defence Staff of the Ministry of Defence.

Awards and decorations 
He was awarded the Vishisht Seva Medal in 2016, the Ati Vishisht Seva Medal in 2019. and the Param Vishisht Seva Medal in 2023.

Dates of rank

References 

Living people
Indian generals
National Defence Academy (India) alumni
Indian Military Academy alumni
Defence Services Command and Staff College graduates
Recipients of the Ati Vishisht Seva Medal
Recipients of the Vishisht Seva Medal
Military personnel from Uttarakhand
Year of birth missing (living people)
Indian military attachés
Army War College, Mhow alumni
Defence Services Staff College alumni
Academic staff of the Defence Services Staff College